Suzi Yoonessi (born February 21, 1978) is an American filmmaker.  She wrote and directed the award-winning feature film Dear Lemon Lima, and directed the Duplass Brothers film Unlovable and Daphne and Velma for Warner Brothers. Yoonessi's short films No Shoulder and Dear Lemon Lima are distributed by Shorts International and Vanguard Cinema and her documentary film Vern is distributed by National Film Network  and is in the permanent collection of the San Francisco Museum of Modern Art.

Biography 
Suzi Yoonessi was born in Buffalo, New York, where she attended Nichols School. Yoonessi was a member of Buffalo's first all-female band Bertha Mason during the Riot Grrrl movement in the early 90s. Yoonessi studied photography and film at the San Francisco Art Institute. Upon graduation, she worked for Surface Magazine in the editorial department and moved to New York to pursue filmmaking after being awarded a Jerome Foundation grant for her documentary film Vern. Yoonessi received her MFA from Columbia University School of the Arts where she was the recipient of the FMI Directing Fellowship. She currently resides in Los Angeles and is a director at Walt Disney Animation Studios.

Directing 

Suzi Yoonessi's first feature film Dear Lemon Lima premiered at the Los Angeles Film Festival where it received critical acclaim and a jury prize for Outstanding Performance. The film went on to play in over 80 film festivals, picking up audience awards and a grand jury prize at the San Francisco International Asian American Film Festival. The film was released internationally, then domestically on VOD and in theaters in Los Angeles and New York by Phase 4 Films. Yoonessi's sophomore film Unlovable received a special jury recognition at the SXSW Film Festival, and was released by Orion Classics. Yoonessi directed The Spring of Sorrow for the Independent Television Service series FutureStates and the hit series The Dead Girls Detective Agency for Snap Originals. In October 2019, it was announced that Yoonessi is developing an original film with Walt Disney Animation Studios.

Awards 
 2018 Emmy Nomination Outstanding Directing
 2018 Special Jury Recognition SXSW Film Festival
 2017 Sun Valley Film Lab Award Winner
2014 Funny or Die's 1st Annual Make Em' LAFF Award - Los Angeles Film Festival
2010 Camério Irvin Pelletier Humanitas - Festival International de Cinema Jeunesse de Rimouski
2010 Camério Hydro-Québec - Festival International de Cinema Jeunesse de Rimouski
2010 Miloš Macourek Award - Film Festival Zlín
2009 Audience Award - Woodstock Film Festival
2009 Audience Award - Anchorage International Film Festival
2009 Emerging Star Award (Savanah Wiltfong) - Anchorage International Film Festival
2009 Spirit of Independence - Fort Lauderdale International Film Festival
2009 Finalist, Bandeira Paulista - São Paulo International Film Festival
2009 Grand Jury Prize - San Francisco International Asian American Film Festival
2009 Outstanding Performance (Shayne Topp) - Los Angeles Film Festival
2008 Tribeca All Access On Track Grant
2008 Film Independent Kodak Grant
2007 National Geographic All Roads Film Grant
2006 Jerome Foundation NYC Media Arts Grant
2002 Jerome Foundation NYC Media Arts Grant

Filmography

Director
2019 Insatiable
2018 The Dead Girls Detective Agency
2018 Unlovable
2018 Daphne and Velma
2017 Relationship Status
2015 Olive and Mocha: First Kiss
2015 Troop Hood
2015 Gortimer Gibbon's Life on Normal Street - Gortimer and the Lost Treasure of Normal Street
2011 Olive and Mocha: Fast Times at Sugar High
2010 The Spring of Sorrow
2009 Dear Lemon Lima
2006 Dear Lemon Lima short
2005 No Shoulder
2004 Vern

Producer
2005 Me and You and Everyone We Know (Associate Producer)
2004 Vern
2001 3 Weeks After Paradise

References

External links 
 Suzi Yoonessi's Official site
 
 
 
 Netflix
 Flux
 Video Interview

American people of Iranian descent
American women screenwriters
1978 births
Living people
American women film directors
Writers from Buffalo, New York
Writers from Los Angeles
Columbia University School of the Arts alumni
San Francisco Art Institute alumni
Film directors from Los Angeles
Screenwriters from New York (state)
Screenwriters from California
21st-century American women writers
21st-century American screenwriters
Film directors from New York (state)